Genga is a town and comune of province of Ancona in the Italian region of the Marche, on the Sentino river about  downstream and east of Sassoferrato and  north of Fabriano.

The town is best known as the ancestral home of the noble family of the della Genga, the most famous member of which was Pope Leo XII.

Main sights
Grotte di Frasassi, they are a karst caves system most famous show caves in Italy.
the Romanesque abbey at S. Vittore alle Chiuse (11th century).
Museum of the church of San Clemente. It houses a triptych and a 15th-century banner by Antonio da Fabriano.
Spaelaeo-Palaeontologic Museum, including a famous fossil of an Ichthyosaur known as Gengasaurus found in the area in 1976.

References

External links
 

Cities and towns in the Marche